Little Charley Bear is a British CGI-animated television series created by Daniel Pickering. Narrated by James Corden, Little Charley Bear takes viewers on a journey into the world of let's pretend, where anything is possible. Little Charley Bear made its television debut in January 2011 on CBeebies. The show has been sold into more than 80 territories.

In 2012, a one off stage version was made, Little Charley Bear and His Christmas Adventure written and directed by Brian Herring. 

In 2013, DreamWorks Animation bought the rights to Chapman Entertainment's library and children's shows.

In 2020 Little Charley Bear official YouTube channel was launched, with all 52 episodes available.

Characters
All characters appear as toys in the series, they are silent instead of voice actors.

 Little Charley Bear: a stuffed toy bear.
 Caramel: a wooden pop-up cow.
 Nibblit: a stuffed toy rabbit.
 Midge: a stuffed toy bear.
 Bellarina: a peg wooden doll girl.
 Frozo: a squeaky toy penguin.
 Rivert: a toy robot.

Home Media
HIT Entertainment released four DVDs of the series in the United Kingdom between 2011 and 2012, each containing seven episodes - "Are You There, Charley Bear?", "Ready Teddy Go!", "Anarctic Charley", and "Charley on Safari".

The series was also released on DVD in Australia by Beyond Home Entertainment.

Toyline
A toyline produced by Vivid Imaginations was released for the Fall of 2011.

References

External links
 

2010s British animated television series
2010s British children's television series
British computer-animated television series
British children's animated adventure television series
British children's animated fantasy television series
British preschool education television series
Television series by Universal Television
DreamWorks Classics
BBC children's television shows
Animated television series about bears
Animated television series about children
CBeebies
Animated preschool education television series
2010s preschool education television series
English-language television shows